Lewis Telle Cannon (April 22, 1872 – October 10, 1946) was an early 20th-century architect in Salt Lake City, Utah that designed several buildings throughout the intermountain west. Cannon was trained at the Massachusetts Institute of Technology and after returning to Utah began a firm with Ramm Hansen for a brief time in 1908 and then another firm with John Fetzer (architect) named Cannon & Fetzer in 1909. Cannon & Fetzer existed until 1937 and produced civic buildings, meetinghouses, and residences, many of which remain and are listed on the National Register of Historic Places.

Personal life
Lewis was born to the Church of Jesus Christ of Latter-day Saints leader George Q. Cannon and Martha Telle Cannon on April 22, 1872. Cannon was also a member of this Church. He was the half-brother to architect Georgius Y. Cannon. Lewis died October 10, 1946, in Salt Lake City.

20th-century American architects
Architects from Salt Lake City
Latter Day Saints from Utah
Architects of Latter Day Saint religious buildings and structures
Cannon family
Massachusetts Institute of Technology alumni
1872 births
1942 deaths